Micky Maus is a German comics magazine containing Disney comics. It has been published since 1951 by Egmont Ehapa.

History 
The magazine was originally published monthly, but supplemented with occasional special issues containing longer stories.  As the audience grew, the special issues  became more frequent. In 1956, the  two comics combined to become a biweekly.  Longer stories, which were previously intended for the special issues, appeared since then as continuation stories published over several issues. 

In 1957, with issue #26, the magazine began a weekly schedule. 

In 1991 the series was a rare exception to the downwards trend of comic sales in the world. It reached the height of its popularity during the early 1990s, with more than 800,000 copies per issue sold on average in 1992. In 1998, the combined sales of Micky Maus passed a billion, making it one of the highest-selling comic series of all time. Since the late 1990s, sales figures have rapidly declined to 75.329 per issue (2016). After a long period as a weekly, the publication frequency of Micky Maus decreased to three times a month in 2016 and again to bimonthly in 2017.

References

External links

Comics magazines published in Germany
Mickey Mouse comics
Disney comics titles
1951 comics debuts
Magazines established in 1951
1951 establishments in Germany